Mohammad Irfan Khan Niazi (born 28 December 2002) is a Pakistani cricketer.

Early career
Born in Mianwali, Punjab, Irfan switched from tape-ball to hard-ball cricket in 2015 by joining the city's Ikram Shaheed Cricket Club, while after club cricket he played Under-19 cricket, at district level with Mianwali in 2016 and at regional level with Faisalabad in 2017.

Due to his performances, he was eventually named in Pakistan's squad for the 2020 Under-19 Cricket World Cup.

Domestic career
In September 2019, he was named in the newly formed Central Punjab for the 2019–20 domestic season. He was retained by Central Punjab for the 2020–21 domestic season. 

In February 2020, Irfan made his List A debut for Pakistan Shaheens against the Marylebone Cricket Club (MCC), during the MCC's tour of Pakistan. 

In September 2020, he made his Twenty20 debut for Central Punjab in the 2020–21 National T20 Cup. 

In December 2021, he was named in Pakistan's team for the 2022 ICC Under-19 Cricket World Cup in the West Indies.

References

External links
 
 Irfan Khan at PCB

2002 births
Living people
Pashtun people
Pakistani cricketers
Place of birth missing (living people)
Central Punjab cricketers
Cricketers from Mianwali